El Pla dels Roures is a locality located in the municipality of Lladurs, in Province of Lleida province, Catalonia, Spain. As of 2020, it has a population of 8.

Geography 
El Pla dels Roures is located 101km east-northeast of Lleida.

References

Populated places in the Province of Lleida